Baptists form a major branch of Protestantism distinguished by baptizing professing Christian believers only (believer's baptism), and doing so by complete immersion. Baptist churches also generally subscribe to the doctrines of soul competency (the responsibility and accountability of every person before God), sola fide (salvation by just faith alone), sola scriptura (scripture alone as the rule of faith and practice) and congregationalist church government. Baptists generally recognize two ordinances: baptism and communion.

Diverse from their beginning, those identifying as Baptists today differ widely from one another in what they believe, how they worship, their attitudes toward other Christians, and their understanding of what is important in Christian discipleship.
For example, Baptist theology may include Arminian or Calvinist beliefs with various sub-groups holding different or competing positions, while others allow for diversity in this matter within their denominations or congregations.

Historians trace the earliest Baptist church to 1609 in Amsterdam, Dutch Republic with English Separatist John Smyth as its pastor. In accordance with his reading of the New Testament, he rejected baptism of infants and instituted baptism only of believing adults. Baptist practice spread to England, where the General Baptists considered Christ's atonement to extend to all people, while the Particular Baptists believed that it extended only to the elect. Thomas Helwys formulated a distinctively Baptist request that the church and the state be kept separate in matters of law, so that individuals might have freedom of religion. Helwys died in prison as a consequence of the religious conflict with English Dissenters under James I. In 1638, Roger Williams established the first Baptist congregation in the North American colonies. In the 18th and 19th centuries, the First and Second Great Awakening increased church membership in the United States. Swedish Baptists (Scandinavian Baptists) have origins in the Radical Pietism movement that split off from the Lutheran Church of Sweden due to the Conventicle Act (Sweden) rather than the English Dissenters that split off from the Anglican Church of England, but both reached similar conclusions on theology. Baptist missionaries have spread their faith to every continent.

Origins
Baptist historian Bruce Gourley outlines four main views of Baptist origins:

 the modern scholarly consensus that the movement traces its origin to the 17th century via the English Separatists,
 the view that it was an outgrowth of the Anabaptist movement of believer's baptism begun in 1525 on the European continent,
 the perpetuity view which assumes that the Baptist faith and practice has existed since the time of Christ, and
 the successionist view, or "Baptist successionism", which argues that Baptist churches actually existed in an unbroken chain since the time of Christ.

English separatist view

Modern Baptist churches trace their history to the English Separatist movement in the 1600s, the century after the rise of the original Protestant denominations. This view of Baptist origins has the most historical support and is the most widely accepted. Adherents to this position consider the influence of Anabaptists upon early Baptists to be minimal. It was a time of considerable political and religious turmoil. Both individuals and churches were willing to give up their theological roots if they became convinced that a more biblical "truth" had been discovered.

During the Protestant Reformation, the Church of England (Anglicans) separated from the Roman Catholic Church. There were some Christians who were not content with the achievements of the mainstream Protestant Reformation. There also were Christians who were disappointed that the Church of England had not made corrections of what some considered to be errors and abuses. Of those most critical of the Church's direction, some chose to stay and try to make constructive changes from within the Anglican Church. They became known as "Puritans" and are described by Gourley as cousins of the English Separatists. Others decided they must leave the Church because of their dissatisfaction and became known as the Separatists.

In 1579, Faustus Socinus founded the Unitarians in Poland, which was a tolerant country. The Unitarians taught baptism by immersion. When Poland ceased to be tolerant, they fled to Holland. In Holland, the Unitarians introduced immersion baptism to the Dutch Mennonites.

Baptist churches have their origins in a movement started by the English John Smyth and Thomas Helwys in Amsterdam. Due to their shared beliefs with the Puritans and Congregationalists, they went into exile in 1607 for Holland with other believers who held the same biblical positions. They believe that the Bible is to be the only guide and that the believer's baptism is what the scriptures require. In 1609, the year considered to be the foundation of the movement, they baptized believers and founded the first Baptist church.

In 1609, while still there, Smyth wrote a tract titled "The Character of the Beast," or "The False Constitution of the Church." In it he expressed two propositions: first, infants are not to be baptized; and second, "Antichristians converted are to be admitted into the true Church by baptism." Hence, his conviction was that a scriptural church should consist only of regenerate believers who have been baptized on a personal confession of faith. He rejected the Separatist movement's doctrine of infant baptism (paedobaptism). Shortly thereafter, Smyth left the group. Ultimately, Smyth became committed to believers' baptism as the only biblical baptism. He was convinced on the basis of his interpretation of Scripture that infants would not be damned should they die in infancy. Smyth, convinced that his self-baptism was invalid, applied with the Mennonites for membership. He died while waiting for membership, and some of his followers became Mennonites. Thomas Helwys and others kept their baptism and their Baptist commitments. The modern Baptist denomination is an outgrowth of Smyth's movement. Baptists rejected the name Anabaptist when they were called that by opponents in derision. McBeth writes that as late as the 18th century, many Baptists referred to themselves as "the Christians commonly—though falsely—called Anabaptists."

Thomas Helwys took over the leadership, leading the church back to England in 1611 and published the first Baptist confession of faith "A Declaration of Faith of English People" in 1611. He founded the first General Baptist Church in Spitalfields, east London, England in 1612.

Another milestone in the early development of Baptist doctrine was in 1638 with John Spilsbury, a Calvinistic minister who helped to promote the strict practice of believer's baptism by immersion (as opposed to affusion or aspersion). According to Tom Nettles, professor of historical theology at Southern Baptist Theological Seminary, "Spilsbury's cogent arguments for a gathered, disciplined congregation of believers baptized by immersion as constituting the New Testament church gave expression to and built on insights that had emerged within separatism, advanced in the life of John Smyth and the suffering congregation of Thomas Helwys, and matured in Particular Baptists."

Anabaptist influence view
A minority view is that early-17th-century Baptists were influenced by (but not directly connected to) continental Anabaptists. According to this view, the General Baptists shared similarities with Dutch Waterlander Mennonites (one of many Anabaptist groups) including believer's baptism only, religious liberty, separation of church and state, and Arminian views of salvation, predestination and original sin. Representative writers including A.C. Underwood and William R. Estep. Gourley wrote that among some contemporary Baptist scholars who emphasize the faith of the community over soul liberty, the Anabaptist influence theory is making a comeback.

However, the relations between Baptists and Anabaptists were early strained. In 1624, the then five existing Baptist churches of London issued a condemnation of the Anabaptists. Furthermore, the original group associated with Smyth and popularly believed to be the first Baptists broke with the Waterlander Mennonite Anabaptists after a brief period of association in the Netherlands.

Perpetuity and succession view

Traditional Baptist historians write from the perspective that Baptists had existed since the time of Christ. Proponents of the Baptist successionist or perpetuity view consider the Baptist movement to have existed independently from Roman Catholicism and prior to the Protestant Reformation.

The perpetuity view is often identified with The Trail of Blood, a booklet of five lectures by J.M. Carrol published in 1931. Other Baptist writers who advocate the successionist theory of Baptist origins are John T. Christian, Thomas Crosby, G. H. Orchard, J. M. Cramp, William Cathcart, Adam Taylor and D. B. Ray. This view was also held by English Baptist preacher, Charles Spurgeon as well as Jesse Mercer, the namesake of Mercer University.

In 1898 William Whitsitt was pressured to resign his presidency of the Southern Baptist Theological Seminary for denying Baptist successionism.

Baptist origins in the United Kingdom

In 1612, Thomas Helwys established a Baptist congregation in London, consisting of congregants from Smyth's church. A number of other Baptist churches sprang up, and they became known as the General Baptists. The Particular Baptists were established when a group of Calvinist Separatists adopted believers' Baptism. The Particular Baptists consisted of seven churches by 1644 and had created a confession of faith called the First London Confession of Faith.

Baptist origins in North America

Both Roger Williams and John Clarke, his compatriot and coworker for religious freedom, are variously credited as founding the earliest Baptist church in North America. In 1639, Williams established a Baptist church in Providence, Rhode Island, and Clarke began a Baptist church in Newport, Rhode Island. According to a Baptist historian who has researched the matter extensively, "There is much debate over the centuries as to whether the Providence or Newport church deserved the place of 'first' Baptist congregation in America. Exact records for both congregations are lacking."

The Great Awakening energized the Baptist movement, and the Baptist community experienced spectacular growth. Baptists became the largest Christian community in many southern states, including among the enslaved Black population.

Baptist missionary work in Canada began in the British colony of Nova Scotia (present day Nova Scotia and New Brunswick) in the 1760s. The first official record of a Baptist church in Canada was that of the Horton Baptist Church (now Wolfville) in Wolfville, Nova Scotia on 29 October 1778. The church was established with the assistance of the New Light evangelist Henry Alline. Many of Alline's followers, after his death, would convert and strengthen the Baptist presence in the Atlantic region. Two major groups of Baptists formed the basis of the churches in the Maritimes. These were referred to as Regular Baptist (Calvinistic in their doctrine) and Free Will Baptists (Arminian in their doctrine).

In May 1845, the Baptist congregations in the United States split over slavery and missions. The Home Mission Society prevented slaveholders from being appointed as missionaries. The split created the Southern Baptist Convention, while the northern congregations formed their own umbrella organization now called the American Baptist Churches USA (ABC-USA). The Methodist Episcopal Church, South had recently separated over the issue of slavery, and southern Presbyterians would do so shortly thereafter.

In 2015, Baptists in the U.S. number 50 million people and constitute roughly one-third of American Protestants.

Baptist origins in Ukraine

The Baptist churches in Ukraine were preceded by the German Anabaptist and Mennonite communities, who had been living in the south of Ukraine since the 16th century, and who practiced adult believers baptism. The first Baptist baptism (adult baptism by full immersion) in Ukraine took place in 1864 on the river Inhul in the Yelizavetgrad region (now Kropyvnytskyi region), in a German settlement. In 1867, the first Baptist communities were organized in that area. From there, the Baptist movement spread across the south of Ukraine and then to other regions as well. One of the first Baptist communities was registered in Kyiv in 1907, and in 1908 the First All-Russian Convention of Baptists was held there, as Ukraine was still controlled by the Russian Empire. The All-Russian Union of Baptists was established in the town of Yekaterinoslav (now Dnipro) in Southern Ukraine. At the end of the 19th century, estimates are that there were between 100,000 and 300,000 Baptists in Ukraine. An independent All-Ukrainian Baptist Union of Ukraine was established during the brief period of Ukraine's independence in early 20th-century, and once again after the fall of the Soviet Union, the largest of which is currently known as the Evangelical Baptist Union of Ukraine.

Missionary organizations
Missionary organizations favored the development of the movement on all continents. In England there was the founding of the Baptist Missionary Society in 1792 at Kettering, England. In United States, there was the founding of International Ministries in 1814 and International Mission Board in 1845.

Baptist affiliations
Many churches are members of a national and international denomination for a cooperative relationship in common organizations, missionary, humanitarian as well as schools and theological institutes. There also are a substantial number of cooperative groups. In 1905, the Baptist World Alliance (BWA) was formed by 24 Baptist denominations from various countries. The BWA's goals include caring for the needy, leading in world evangelism and defending human rights and religious freedom.

Finally, there are Independent Baptist churches that choose to remain independent of any denomination, organization, or association.

Membership

Statistics
According to a Baptist World Alliance census released in 2022, the largest Baptist denomination in the world, it would regroup 246 Baptist denominations members in 128 countries, 176,000 churches and 51,000,000 baptized members. These statistics are not fully representative, however, since some churches in the United States have dual or triple national Baptist affiliation, causing a church and its members to be counted by more than one Baptist denomination. 

In 2010, 100 million Christians identify themselves as Baptist or belong to Baptist-type churches. In 2020, according to the researcher Sébastien Fath of the CNRS, the movement would have around 170 million believers in the world.

Among the censuses carried out by the Baptist denominations in 2021, those which claimed the most members were on each continent:

In Africa, the Nigerian Baptist Convention with 13,654 churches and 8,000,637 members, the Baptist Convention of Tanzania with 1,300 churches and 2,660,000 members, the Baptist Community of the Congo River with 2,668 churches and 1,760,634 members.

In North America, the Southern Baptist Convention with 47,530 churches and 14,525,579 members, the National Baptist Convention, USA with 21,145 churches and 8,415,100 members.

In South America, the Brazilian Baptist Convention with 9,018 churches and 1,790,227 members, the Evangelical Baptist Convention of Argentina with 670 churches and 85,000 members.

In Asia, the Myanmar Baptist Convention with 5,319 churches and 1,710,441 members, the Nagaland Baptist Church Council with 1,615 churches and 610,825 members, the Boro Baptist Church Association with 219 churches and 40,000 members, the Boro Baptist Convention with 353 churches and over 52,000 members, the Garo Baptist Convention with 2,619 and 333,908 members, the Convention of Philippine Baptist Churches with 2,668 churches and 600,000 members.

In Europe, the All-Ukrainian Union of Churches of Evangelical Christian Baptists with 2,272 churches and 113,000 members, the Baptist Union of Great Britain with 1,895 churches and 111, 208 members, the Union of Evangelical Free Churches in Germany with 801 churches and 80,195 members.

In Oceania, the Baptist Union of Papua New Guinea with 489 churches and 84,000 members, the Australian Baptist Ministries with 1,021 churches and 76,046 members.

Qualification for membership
Membership policies vary due to the autonomy of churches, but generally an individual becomes a member of a church through believer's baptism (which is a public profession of faith in Jesus, followed by immersion baptism).

Most baptists do not believe that baptism is a requirement for salvation, but rather a public expression of one's inner repentance and faith. Therefore, some churches will admit into membership persons who make a profession without believer's baptism.

In general, Baptist churches do not have a stated age restriction on membership, but believer's baptism requires that an individual be able to freely and earnestly profess their faith. (See Age of Accountability)

Baptist beliefs

Since the early days of the Baptist movement, various denominations have adopted common confessions of faith as the basis for cooperative work among churches. Each church has a particular confession of faith and a common confession of faith if it is a member of a denomination. Some historically significant Baptist doctrinal documents include the 1689 London Baptist Confession of Faith, 1742 Philadelphia Baptist Confession, the 1833 New Hampshire Baptist Confession of Faith, and written church covenants which some individual Baptist churches adopt as a statement of their faith and beliefs.

Baptist theology shares many doctrines with evangelical theology. It is based on believers' Church doctrine.

Baptists, like other Christians, are defined by school of thought—some of it common to all orthodox and evangelical groups and a portion of it distinctive to Baptists. Through the years, different Baptist groups have issued confessions of faith—without considering them to be creeds—to express their particular doctrinal distinctions in comparison to other Christians as well as in comparison to other Baptists. Baptist denominations are traditionally seen as belonging to two parties, General Baptists who uphold Arminian theology and Particular Baptists who uphold Reformed theology. During the holiness movement, some General Baptists accepted the teaching of a second work of grace and formed denominations that emphasized this belief, such as the Ohio Valley Association of the Christian Baptist Churches of God and the Holiness Baptist Association. Most Baptists are evangelical in doctrine, but their beliefs may vary due to the congregational governance system that gives autonomy to individual local Baptist churches. Historically, Baptists have played a key role in encouraging religious freedom and separation of church and state.

Shared doctrines would include beliefs about one God; the virgin birth; miracles; atonement for sins through the death, burial, and bodily resurrection of Jesus; the Trinity; the need for salvation (through belief in Jesus Christ as the Son of God, his death and resurrection); grace; the Kingdom of God; last things (eschatology) (Jesus Christ will return personally and visibly in glory to the earth, the dead will be raised, and Christ will judge everyone in righteousness); and evangelism and missions.

Most Baptists hold that no church or ecclesiastical organization has inherent authority over a Baptist church. Churches can properly relate to each other under this polity only through voluntary cooperation, never by any sort of coercion. Furthermore, this Baptist polity calls for freedom from governmental control.

Exceptions to this local form of local governance include a few churches that submit to the leadership of a body of elders, as well as the Episcopal Baptists that have an Episcopal system.

Baptists generally believe in the literal Second Coming of Christ. Beliefs among Baptists regarding the "end times" include amillennialism, dispensationalism, and historic premillennialism, with views such as postmillennialism and preterism receiving some support.

Some additional distinctive Baptist principles held by many Baptists:
 The supremacy of the canonical Scriptures as a norm of faith and practice. For something to become a matter of faith and practice, it is not sufficient for it to be merely consistent with and not contrary to scriptural principles. It must be something explicitly ordained through command or example in the Bible. For instance, this is why Baptists do not practice infant baptism—they say the Bible neither commands nor exemplifies infant baptism as a Christian practice. More than any other Baptist principle, this one when applied to infant baptism is said to separate Baptists from other evangelical Christians.
 Baptists believe that faith is a matter between God and the individual (religious freedom). To them it means the advocacy of absolute liberty of conscience.
 Insistence on immersion believer's baptism as the only mode of baptism. Baptists do not believe that baptism is necessary for salvation. Therefore, for Baptists, baptism is an ordinance, not a sacrament, since, in their view, it imparts no saving grace.

Beliefs that vary among Baptists

Since there is no hierarchical authority and each Baptist church is autonomous, there is no official set of Baptist theological beliefs. These differences exist both among associations, and even among churches within the associations.

Some doctrinal issues on which there is widespread difference among Baptists are:

 Eschatology
 Arminianism versus Calvinism (General Baptists uphold Arminian theology while Particular Baptists teach Calvinist theology).
 The doctrine of separation from "the world" and whether to associate with those who are "of the world"
 Belief in a second work of grace, i.e. entire sanctification (held by General Baptists in the Holiness tradition)
 Speaking-in-tongues and the operation of other charismatic gifts of the Holy Spirit in the charismatic churches
 How the Bible should be interpreted (hermeneutics)
 The extent to which missionary boards should be used to support missionaries
 The extent to which non-members may participate in the Lord's Supper services
 Which translation of Scripture to use (see King-James-Only movement in the English-speaking world)
 Dispensationalism versus Covenant theology
 The role of women in marriage.
 The ordination of women as deacons or pastors.
 Attitudes to and involvement in the ecumenical movement.

Excommunication is used as a last resort by denominations and churches for members who do not want to repent of beliefs or behavior at odds with the confession of faith of the community.

Worship
In Baptist churches, worship service is part of the life of the Church and includes praise (Christian music), worship, of prayers to God, a sermon based on the Bible, offering, and periodically the Lord's Supper. In many churches, there are services adapted for children, even teenagers. Prayer meetings are also held during the week.

Places of worship

The architecture is sober and the Latin cross is one of the only spiritual symbols that can usually be seen on the building of a Baptist church and that identifies the place where it belongs.

Education 

Baptist churches established elementary and secondary schools, Bible colleges, colleges and universities as early as the 1680s in England, before continuing in various countries. In 2006, the International Association of Baptist Colleges and Universities was founded in the United States. In 2022, it had 46 member universities.

Sexuality 

In matters of sexuality, Baptist congregations are theologically diverse, ranging from LGBT affirming to only marriage between a man and a woman, as well as in promotion of virginity pledges to young Baptist Christians, who are invited to engage in a public ceremony at sexual abstinence until Christian marriage. This pact is often symbolized by a purity ring. Programs like True Love Waits, founded in 1993 by the Southern Baptist Convention have been developed to support the commitments.

In many Baptist churches, same-sex marriage and same-gender love is affirmed and celebrated as is true in the Alliance of Baptists Denomination  and for many churches in the Cooperative Baptist Fellowship  and the American Baptist Churches USA.  Many Baptist congregations have also been at the forefront of the conversations on ending same-sex marriage bans. In 2014, the Alliance joined a lawsuit challenging North Carolina's ban on same-sex marriage, which is America's first faith-based challenge to same-sex marriage bans.

Controversies that have shaped Baptists
Baptists have faced many controversies in their 400-year history, controversies of the level of crises. Baptist historian Walter Shurden says the word crisis comes from the Greek word meaning 'to decide.' Shurden writes that contrary to the presumed negative view of crises, some controversies that reach a crisis level may actually be "positive and highly productive." He claims that even schism, though never ideal, has often produced positive results. In his opinion crises among Baptists each have become decision-moments that shaped their future. Some controversies that have shaped Baptists include the "missions crisis", the "slavery crisis", the "landmark crisis", and the "modernist crisis".

Missions crisis
Early in the 19th century, the rise of the modern missions movement, and the backlash against it, led to widespread and bitter controversy among the American Baptists. During this era, the American Baptists were split between missionary and anti-missionary. A substantial secession of Baptists went into the movement led by Alexander Campbell to return to a more fundamental church.

Slavery crisis

United States

Leading up to the American Civil War, Baptists became embroiled in the controversy over slavery in the United States. Whereas in the First Great Awakening Methodist and Baptist preachers had opposed slavery and urged manumission, over the decades they made more of an accommodation with the institution. They worked with slaveholders in the South to urge a paternalistic institution. Both denominations made direct appeals to slaves and free Blacks for conversion. The Baptists particularly allowed them active roles in congregations. By the mid-19th century, northern Baptists tended to oppose slavery. As tensions increased, in 1844 the Home Mission Society refused to appoint a slaveholder as a missionary who had been proposed by Georgia. It noted that missionaries could not take servants with them, and also that the board did not want to appear to condone slavery.

In 1845, a group of churches in favor of slavery and in disagreement with the abolitionism of the Triennial Convention (now American Baptist Churches USA) left to form the Southern Baptist Convention. They believed that the Bible sanctions slavery and that it was acceptable for Christians to own slaves. They believed slavery was a human institution which Baptist teaching could make less harsh. By this time many planters were part of Baptist congregations, and some of the denomination's prominent preachers, such as the Rev. Basil Manly, Sr., president of the University of Alabama, were also planters who owned slaves.

As early as the late 18th century, Black Baptists began to organize separate churches, associations and mission agencies. Blacks set up some independent Baptist congregations in the South before the American Civil War. White Baptist associations maintained some oversight of these churches.

In the postwar years, freedmen quickly left the white congregations and associations, setting up their own churches. In 1866, the Consolidated American Baptist Convention, formed from Black Baptists of the South and West, helped southern associations set up Black state conventions, which they did in Alabama, Arkansas, Virginia, North Carolina, and Kentucky. In 1880, Black state conventions united in the national Foreign Mission Convention to support Black Baptist missionary work. Two other national Black conventions were formed, and in 1895 they united as the National Baptist Convention. This organization later went through its own changes, spinning off other conventions. It is the largest Black religious organization and the second-largest Baptist organization in the world. Baptists are numerically most dominant in the Southeast.

In 2007, the Pew Research Center's Religious Landscape Survey found that 45% of all African Americans identify with Baptist denominations, with the vast majority of those being within the historically Black tradition.

In the American South, the interpretation of the American Civil War, abolition of slavery and postwar period has differed sharply by race since those years. Americans have often interpreted great events in religious terms. Historian Wilson Fallin contrasts the interpretation of Civil War and Reconstruction in white versus Black memory by analyzing Baptist sermons documented in Alabama. Soon after the Civil War, most Black Baptists in the South left the Southern Baptist Convention, reducing its numbers by hundreds of thousands or more. They quickly organized their own congregations and developed their own regional and state associations and, by the end of the 19th century, a national convention.

White preachers in Alabama after Reconstruction expressed the view that:

Black preachers interpreted the Civil War, Emancipation and Reconstruction as:
"God's gift of freedom." They had a gospel of liberation, having long identified with the Book of Exodus from slavery in the Old Testament. They took opportunities to exercise their independence, to worship in their own way, to affirm their worth and dignity, and to proclaim the fatherhood of God and the brotherhood of man. Most of all, they quickly formed their own churches, associations, and conventions to operate freely without white supervision. These institutions offered self-help and racial uplift, a place to develop and use leadership, and places for proclamation of the gospel of liberation. As a result, Black preachers said that God would protect and help him and God's people; God would be their rock in a stormy land.

The Southern Baptist Convention supported white supremacy and its results: disenfranchising most Blacks and many poor whites at the turn of the 20th century by raising barriers to voter registration, and passage of racial segregation laws that enforced the system of Jim Crow. Its members largely resisted the civil rights movement in the South, which sought to enforce their constitutional rights for public access and voting; and enforcement of midcentury federal civil rights laws.

In 1995, the Southern Baptist Convention passed a resolution that recognized the failure of their ancestors to protect the civil rights of African Americans. More than 20,000 Southern Baptists registered for the meeting in Atlanta. The resolution declared that messengers, as SBC delegates are called, "unwaveringly denounce racism, in all its forms, as deplorable sin" and "lament and repudiate historic acts of evil such as slavery from which we continue to reap a bitter harvest." It offered an apology to all African Americans for "condoning and/or perpetuating individual and systemic racism in our lifetime" and repentance for "racism of which we have been guilty, whether consciously or unconsciously." Although Southern Baptists have condemned racism in the past, this was the first time the convention, predominantly white since the Reconstruction era, had specifically addressed the issue of slavery.

The statement sought forgiveness "from our African-American brothers and sisters" and pledged to "eradicate racism in all its forms from Southern Baptist life and ministry." In 1995, about 500,000 members of the 15.6-million-member denomination were African Americans and another 300,000 were ethnic minorities. The resolution marked the denomination's first formal acknowledgment that racism played a role in its founding.

Caribbean islands

Elsewhere in the Americas, in the Caribbean in particular, Baptist missionaries and members took an active role in the anti-slavery movement. In Jamaica, for example, William Knibb, a prominent British Baptist missionary, worked toward the emancipation of slaves in the British West Indies (which took place in full in 1838). Knibb also supported the creation of "Free Villages" and sought funding from English Baptists to buy land for freedmen to cultivate; the Free Villages were envisioned as rural communities to be centred around a Baptist church where emancipated slaves could farm their own land. Thomas Burchell, missionary minister in Montego Bay, also was active in this movement, gaining funds from Baptists in England to buy land for what became known as Burchell Free Village.

Prior to emancipation, Baptist deacon Samuel Sharpe, who served with Burchell, organized a general strike of slaves seeking better conditions. It developed into a major rebellion of as many as 60,000 slaves, which became known as the Christmas Rebellion (when it took place) or the Baptist War. It was put down by government troops within two weeks. During and after the rebellion, an estimated 200 slaves were killed outright, with more than 300 judicially executed later by prosecution in the courts, sometimes for minor offenses.

Baptists were active after emancipation in promoting the education of former slaves; for example, Jamaica's Calabar High School, named after the port of Calabar in Nigeria, was founded by Baptist missionaries. At the same time, during and after slavery, slaves and free Blacks formed their own Spiritual Baptist movements – breakaway spiritual movements which theology often expressed resistance to oppression.

Landmark crisis

Southern Baptist Landmarkism sought to reset the ecclesiastical separation which had characterized the old Baptist churches, in an era when inter-denominational union meetings were the order of the day. James Robinson Graves was an influential Baptist of the 19th century and the primary leader of this movement. While some Landmarkers eventually separated from the Southern Baptist Convention, the movement continued to influence the Convention into the 20th and 21st centuries.

Modernist crisis

The rise of theological modernism in the latter 19th and early 20th centuries also greatly affected Baptists. The Landmark movement, already mentioned, has been described as a reaction among Southern Baptists in the United States against incipient modernism. In England, Charles Haddon Spurgeon fought against modernistic views of the Scripture in the Downgrade Controversy and severed his church from the Baptist Union as a result.

The Northern Baptist Convention in the United States had internal conflict over modernism in the early 20th century, ultimately embracing it. Two new conservative associations of congregations that separated from the convention were founded as a result: the General Association of Regular Baptist Churches in 1933 and the Conservative Baptist Association of America in 1947.

Following similar conflicts over modernism, the Southern Baptist Convention adhered to conservative theology as its official position. In the late 20th century, Southern Baptists who disagreed with this direction founded two new groups: the liberal Alliance of Baptists in 1987 and the more moderate Cooperative Baptist Fellowship in 1991. Originally both schisms continued to identify as Southern Baptist, but over time "became permanent new families of Baptists."

Criticism
In his 1963 book, Strength to Love, Baptist pastor Martin Luther King Jr. criticized some Baptist churches for their anti-intellectualism, especially because of the lack of theological training among pastors.

In 2018, Baptist theologian Russell D. Moore criticized some Baptists in the United States for their moralism emphasizing strongly the condemnation of certain personal sins, but silent on the social injustices that afflict entire populations, such as racism. In 2020, the North American Baptist Fellowship, a region of the Baptist World Alliance, officially made a commitment to social justice and spoke out against institutionalized discrimination in the American justice system.

See also

 English Dissenters
 List of Baptist confessions
 List of Baptist denominations
 List of Baptist World Alliance National Fellowships
 List of Baptists

References

Bibliography
 Beale, David. Baptist History in England and America: Personalities, Positions, and Practices. Maitland, FL: Xulon Press, 2018. 
 .
 .
 Kidd, Thomas S. and Barry Hankins, Baptists in America: A History (2015)
 , comprehensive international History.
 .
 .

Further reading
 Beale, David. Baptist History in England and America: Personalities, Positions, and Practices. Maitland, FL: Xulon Press, 2018. 
 Bebbington, David. Baptists through the Centuries: A History of a Global People (Baylor University Press, 2010) emphasis on the United States and Europe; the last two chapters are on the global context.
 Brackney, William H. A Genetic History of Baptist Thought: With Special Reference to Baptists in Britain and North America (Mercer University Press, 2004), focus on confessions of faith, hymns, theologians, and academics.
 Brackney, William H. ed., Historical Dictionary of the Baptists (2nd ed. Scarecrow, 2009).
 Cathcart, William, ed. The Baptist Encyclopedia (2 vols. 1883). online
 Gavins, Raymond. The Perils and Prospects of Southern Black Leadership: Gordon Blaine Hancock, 1884–1970. Duke University Press, 1977.
 Harrison, Paul M. Authority and Power in the Free Church Tradition: A Social Case Study of the American Baptist Convention Princeton University Press, 1959.
 Harvey, Paul. Redeeming the South: Religious Cultures and Racial Identities among Southern Baptists, 1865–1925 University of North Carolina Press, 1997.
 Heyrman, Christine Leigh. Southern Cross: The Beginnings of the Bible Belt (1997).
 Isaac, Rhy. "Evangelical Revolt: The Nature of the Baptists' Challenge to the Traditional Order in Virginia, 1765 to 1775," William and Mary Quarterly, 3d ser., XXXI (July 1974), 345–68.
 .
Kidd, Thomas S., Barry Hankins, Oxford University Press, 2015
 Leonard, Bill J. Baptists in America (Columbia University Press, 2005).
 
 Pitts, Walter F. Old Ship of Zion: The Afro-Baptist Ritual in the African Diaspora Oxford University Press, 1996.
 Rawlyk, George. Champions of the Truth: Fundamentalism, Modernism, and the Maritime Baptists (1990), Canada.
 Spangler, Jewel L. "Becoming Baptists: Conversion in Colonial and Early National Virginia" Journal of Southern History. Volume: 67. Issue: 2. 2001. pp. 243+
 Stringer, Phil. The Faithful Baptist Witness, Landmark Baptist Press, 1998.
 Underwood, A. C. A History of the English Baptists. London: Kingsgate Press, 1947.
 Whitley, William Thomas A Baptist Bibliography: being a register of the chief materials for Baptist history, whether in manuscript or in print, preserved in Great Britain, Ireland, and the Colonies. 2 vols. London: Kingsgate Press, 1916–22 (reissued) Hildesheim: Georg Olms, 1984 
 
 Wills, Gregory A. Democratic Religion: Freedom, Authority, and Church Discipline in the Baptist South, 1785–1900, Oxford.

Primary sources
 McBeth, H. Leon, ed. A Sourcebook for Baptist Heritage (1990), primary sources for Baptist history.
 McKinion, Steven A., ed. Life and Practice in the Early Church: A Documentary Reader (2001)
 McGlothlin, W. J., ed. Baptist Confessions of Faith. Philadelphia: The American Baptist Publication Society, 1911.

External links

 Early Church Fathers on Baptism
 Oxford bibliographies: "Baptists" (2015) by Janet Moore Lindman
 
 Baptist church history collection, Rare Books and Manuscripts, Indiana State Library

 
 
Christian terminology